David Maiden (born 7 August 1971) is a former Scotland international rugby league footballer and coach played in the 1990s and 2000s.

Playing career
A Ravenshoe junior, Maiden represented the Queensland Residents side in 1994, playing in their game against the New South Wales Residents and their tour of South Africa.

In 1995, Maiden joined the newly-established North Queensland Cowboys. In Round 2 of the 1995 ARL season, he made his first grade debut in a 16–34 loss to the Sydney City Roosters, filling in at centre for the suspended Adrian Vowles. Maiden played just two games for the Cowboys before leaving at the end of the season.

From 1996 to 1998, Maiden played for the Cairns Cyclones in the Queensland Cup.

In 1999, Maiden moved to England, joining the Gateshead Thunder in the Super League. He played 24 games for Gateshead that season, scoring eight tries. In October 1999, he represented Scotland in the Triangular Series.

In 2000, Maiden joined Hull F.C. after the club merged with Gateshead. Later that year, he represented Scotland at the 2000 Rugby League World Cup, scoring a try against New Zealand Māori. In July 2001, he again represented Scotland in a 42–20 win over France, scoring a try. At the end of the 2001 season, Maiden left Hull after playing 49 games for the club.

Statistics

ARL

Super League

International

Coaching career
In 2008, Maiden became an assistant coach of the Northern Pride for their inaugural season in the Queensland Cup. In 2010, he took over as head coach of the club. In his first season in charge, he led the club to their first premiership after defeating the Norths Devils in the Grand Final. He left the club at the end of the 2012 season.

Post-playing career
Since 2015, Maiden has worked as the Queensland Rugby League's major competitions manager.

References

External links

1971 births
Living people
Australian rugby league coaches
Australian rugby league players
Gateshead Thunder (1999) players
Hull F.C. players
North Queensland Cowboys players
Northern Pride RLFC coaches
Rugby league centres
Rugby league locks
Rugby league players from Queensland
Rugby league second-rows
Scotland national rugby league team players